Blót: Sacrifice in Sweden is the second album by Blood Axis.  It was recorded live in November 1997, at the Cold Meat Industry 10th Anniversary Feast in Skylten, Linköping, Sweden.

Overview

The performance incorporated music by Giuseppe Verdi, Johann Sebastian Bach and Sergei Prokofiev; lyrics from the works of Rudyard Kipling, Friedrich Nietzsche and Henry Wadsworth Longfellow; the voices of Oswald Mosley, Benito Mussolini, and wolves.  Ian Read's "Seeker" (originally performed by Fire + Ice) was covered; as well as traditional songs like "Brian Boru's March" and Dave Cousins' "The Hangman And The Papist".

It was released by the Cold Meat Industry record label in 1998 as a CD and as 2x12"s. Artwork used included Carl Larsson's Midvinterblot, which depicts the sacrifice of king Domalde. The album was named after the practice of Blót from Germanic paganism.

Sound assistance was provided by Albin Julius.  The show was recorded on digital multi-track directly from the mixing board, the tapes were brought back to the U.S. to be re-mixed and re-processed by Blood Axis (including Robert Ferbrache).

Track listing
"Sarabande Oratoria"
"Herjafather"
"Seeker"
'"Electricity"
"Lord of Ages"
"The March of Brian Boru"
"The Gospel of Inhumanity"
"Eternal Soul"
"Between Birds of Prey"
"Reign I Forever"
"The Hangman and the Papist"
"Storm of Steel"

Blood Axis albums
1998 live albums